Ilya Uladzimiravich Ivashka (born 24 February 1994) is a Belarusian professional tennis player.
Ivashka has a career-high singles ranking by the Association of Tennis Professionals (ATP) of No. 40, achieved on 20 June 2022. He also has a career-high doubles ranking of world No. 340, reached on 15 August 2016. He is the current No. 1 Belarusian men's singles player. Additionally, Ivashka has won five ITF singles titles and three ITF doubles titles. Ivashka has represented Belarus in Davis Cup, and has a win-loss record of 9–10.

Personal life
Fellow tennis player Karen Khachanov is his brother-in-law, their wives being (twin) sisters.

Professional career

2018: Breakthrough, top 100 debut
He entered the top 150 when he hit a career high ranking of No. 147 on 26 February 2018 after reaching as a qualifier the semifinals of the 2018 Open 13 in Marseille, ranked world No. 193, defeating Laslo Djere, second seed Stan Wawrinka 6-4, 1-1 when the Swiss retired, home favourite Nicolas Mahut in three sets. He became the first Belarusian tour-level semifinalist since Max Mirnyi at 2005 Rotterdam. 

He entered the top 100 on 13 August 2018 after a third-round run also as a qualifier, where he lost to fourth seed Kevin Anderson, for the first time in his career at a Masters 1000 level at the 2018 Canadian Open.

2021: First top 10 win, Wimbledon fourth round, first ATP title, top 50 debut
Ivashka reached his first quarterfinal for 2021 at the Andalucia Open where he defeated two Spaniards en route Pedro Martínez and Alejandro Davidovich Fokina, before falling to the eventual finalist third Spaniard Jaume Munar. He reached his second semifinal in his career at the BMW Open in Munich as a qualifier, more than three years after his run to the final four at the 2018 Open 13 in Marseille, in a stunning defeat against the top seed two-time champion and world No. 6, Alexander Zverev, for the biggest win of his career.

He also qualified and reached his third quarterfinal for 2021 at the Eastbourne International defeating Alexei Popyrin. 
At a career high of world No. 79, achieved on 28 June 2021, on his debut in the main draw at Wimbledon, Ivashka reached the fourth round of a major for the first time in his career defeating Jaume Munar, Jeremy Chardy and Jordan Thompson, having never passed the second round of a major previously. He lost to eventual finalist, seventh seed Matteo Berrettini but reached a career-high of world No. 63 on 12 July 2021.

At the Winston-Salem Open, Ivashka reached his fourth quarterfinal for 2021, defeating ninth seeded Jan-Lennard Struff, and his second semifinal defeating top seed and world No. 12, Pablo Carreno Busta. He then defeated Emil Ruusuvuori to reach his first ATP final and then defeated Mikael Ymer for the title in 56 minutes to become the first player from Belarus to win an ATP Tour singles title since Max Mirnyi in 2003 at Rotterdam. He became the eighth First-Time ATP Tour Champion in 2021. As a result of the victory, he entered the top 60 at world No. 53 on 30 August 2021 for the first time in his career.

At the US Open, he reached the third round for the first time in his career defeating Tennys Sandgren and Vasek Pospisil before losing again to the sixth seed Matteo Berrettini.

A month later after reaching the semifinals at the Astana Open, he made his top 50 debut as world No. 45 on 27 September 2021.

2022: First win at French Open, top 40, US Open fourth round & top 10 win
Ivashka withdrew from the Melbourne Summer Set 1, Sydney Classic, and the Australian Open due to a leg injury.

Ivashka played his first tournament of the season at the Open Sud de France. He lost in the first round to Mackenzie McDonald.

At the Geneva Open, he reached his second quarterfinal of the season, after the one at the Open 13, defeating third seed Denis Shapovalov on the way, before losing to eventual finalist Joao Sousa.
He reached his third quarterfinal at the Rosmalen Open in 's-Hertogenbosch. As a result he reached the top 40, on 20 June 2022.

At the Atlanta Open, he reached the semifinals before losing to eventual champion Alex de Minaur.
At the US Open, he reached the third round for a second time in a row at this major defeating world No. 10 and eight seed Hubert Hurkacz. Next he defeated 26th seed Lorenzo Musetti to reach the fourth round of a major for the second time in his career. He lost to Jannik Sinner in five sets.

At the 2022 Sofia Open he defeated Mikael Ymer in an over 3 hours match and third seed Grigor Dimitrov to reach the quarterfinals.

Performance timelines

Singles 
Current through the 2023 Australian Open.

Doubles 
Current through the 2022 US Open.

ATP career finals

Singles: 1 (1 title)

Davis Cup 

   indicates the outcome of the Davis Cup match followed by the score, date, place of event, the zonal classification and its phase, and the court surface.

Challenger and Futures finals

Singles: 11 (7 titles, 4 runner–ups)

Doubles: 5 (3 titles, 2 runner–ups)

Record against other players

Record against top 10 players
Ilya Ivashka's record against players who have been ranked in the top 10, with those who are active in boldface. Only ATP Tour main draw and Davis Cup matches are considered:

Record against players ranked No. 11–20
Active players are in boldface. 

 Benoit Paire 1–0
 Sam Querrey 1–0
 Albert Ramos Viñolas 1–0
  Andreas Seppi 1–0
  Bernard Tomic 1–0
 Nikoloz Basilashvili 0–1
 Alex de Minaur 0–1
  Kyle Edmund 0–1
 Cristian Garin 0–1
  Guido Pella 0–1
 Feliciano López 1–0
 Lorenzo Musetti 1–1
 Tommy Paul 1–0
*

Wins over top 10 players
He has a  record against players who were, at the time the match was played, ranked in the top 10.

* .

ITF World Tennis Tour Juniors

Singles: 1 (0 titles, 1 runner-up)

Doubles: 2 (1 title, 1 runner-up)

Notes

References

External links
 
 
 

1994 births
Living people
Belarusian male tennis players
Tennis players at the 2020 Summer Olympics
Tennis players from Minsk
Olympic tennis players of Belarus
21st-century Belarusian people